São Mateus is a municipality located in the Brazilian state of Espírito Santo. Its population was estimated at 132,642 in 2020, and its area is 2,346 km².  São Mateus is located at 36 meters above sea level.

It is the second oldest and seventh most populous municipality in the state of Espírito Santo, Brazil. São Mateus was founded on 21 of September 1544, receiving municipal autonomy only in 1764. Originally, it was called Povoado do Cricaré, being renamed in the year 1566 by Father José de Anchieta after Saint Matthew.

Until the second-half of 19th century, it was one of the main gateways of enslaved Africans in Brazil. The large influx of slaves arriving at the Americas by the São Mateus' port explains why today the municipality is considered to have the biggest Afro-descendant population of the state. There were also italian immigrants arriving at the area, these ones being responsible for colonizing part of the backcountry of the municipality.

References

Sao Mateus
Municipalities in Espírito Santo
Populated places established in 1544